Synchroa punctata is a species of synchroa bark beetle in the family Synchroidae. It is native to North America.

References

Further reading

External links

 

Tenebrionoidea
Beetles described in 1838